Eospinus daniltshenkoi is an extinct tetraodontid bony fish from the Eocene.  Its fossils are from the Danata Formation lagerstatten of Ypresian Turkmenistan.

E. daniltshenkoi had four dorsal spines, three of which were on the anterior end of its dorsal side, and the first spine being placed between and below the eyes, almost like a long nose.  It also had a pair of spines near the base of its caudal peduncle, and a spine in front of the anal fin.

In 2002, and confirmed again in 2003, Santini and Tyler erected the family Bolcabalistidae to contain both Eospinus and the Monte Bolca Bolcabalistes as close relatives of both triggerfishes and boxfishes.  The similar Moclaybalistes of Thanetian Denmark was originally also placed in Bolcabalistidae, too, in 2002, but then move it into its own monotypic family of Moclaybalistidae.

See also

 List of prehistoric bony fish
 Spinacanthus
 Protobalistum

Sources

A remarkable new genus of Tetraodontiform fish with features of both Balistids and Ostraciids from the Eocene of Turkmenistan

Tetraodontiformes
Transitional fossils
Eocene fish of Asia
Fossil taxa described in 1992